Calliostoma maui is a species of sea snail, a marine gastropod mollusk in the family Calliostomatidae.

Some authors place this taxon in the subgenus Calliostoma (Maurea) .

Description
The height of the shell attains 45 mm.

Distribution
This marine species occurs off South Island, New Zealand.

References

 Marshall, 1995. A revision of the recent Calliostoma species of New Zealand (Mollusca:Gastropoda:Trochoidea). The Nautilus 108(4):83-127

External links
 

maui
Gastropods described in 1995